Meksi family is an old Albanian family. Members of this family are found in Albania, Italy and Greece (especially Spetses), whose members distinguished themselves in shipping and politics.

History

The Meksi family appeared around the 10th century and is believed to be the first branch of the Bua family. According to Milan Šufflay, the region between Cape Rodon, Kruja and Lezha was inhabited by the Messi, Meksi, Mexi family. The most distant origin must have been the village of Mesi located in the area between the rivers Shkumbin and Drin, near Shkodër. The name of the Meksi clan may originate from the function, office or position of its head, who in this particular case must have been a doctor, while the suffix "si" indicates ownership of the country. In this way, it turns out that Messi, Meksi, was a timar that a Byzantine emperor gave to the doctor, who apparently was the first head of the family.
It appears that the province in the north of Albania, stretching from the north-east of Lezha to the shores of Shkumbin, inhabited by the Meksi, was included in a single principality at the beginning of the last millennium, with Kruja as headquarters. Then this principality was conquered by the Bulgarian kings as well as by the most powerful Albanian principalities, which were located to the south and north of it. Shkodër Land Registry of 1416-17 names a Pietro Mexa in 1445 and a Vucha Messi appears in 1614 as head of the village of Muriqi near Shkodër. During the period of the successful struggles of the Albanian people for freedom, under the leadership of Skanderbeg, the family made an outstanding contribution, which is proven by many documents of the time. Immediately after the complete conquest of Albania by the Turkish hordes, the Meksi family moved in several directions: Dalmatia, Republic of Venice, Italy, Moravia and especially towards the South.
Members of the family offered military services to the Republic of Venice, especially standing out in the Ottoman–Venetian wars of 1465. Famous stradioti and member of the family, Mexa Buziqi, aided Krokodeilos Kladas and Theodore Bua in the revolt against Ottoman empire in Morea. Initially, the family bore the surname Mexis, but later it changed to De Mezzi or Mezan. The last name of the family has changed according to the language of the countries where they have lived. In Albania, ks (Meksi) or s, ss (Mesi, Messi) is used. In the provinces that were occupied by the Venetians during the Middle Ages or that were relocated to Italy ss (Messi, Da Messa), in the Republic of Venice, according to the local dialect, z or zz (De Mezzi, Da Mezan) and in Kotor in Dalmatia x (Mexa). The part of the family that emigrated in Greece, fought in the Greek War of Independence. In Spetses, the family was the wealthiest and most wellknown family, distinguishing themselves in shipping and politics, as well as heroes of the revolution.

Members
Kristo Meksi, Albanian politician
Vangjel Meksi, translator of the New Testament in Albanian
Evangelis Zappas (through his mother), Greek benefactor
Apostol Meksi, Albanian folkorist
Aleksandër Meksi, former Prime Minister of Albania
Hatzigiannis Mexis, was one of the most important figures from Spetses in the Revolutionary War of 1821
Leonidas Drosis (through his mother), Greek neoclassical sculptor

References

Medieval Albanian nobility
Tribes of Albania
Surnames
Surnames of Albanian origin